Guozijian Street (Chinese: 国子监街; Pinyin: Guózǐjiàn Jiē), formerly known as Chengxian Street (Chinese: 成贤街; Pinyin: Chéngxián Jiē), is a street in Dongcheng District, Beijing.  It is listed as an important historical site.  

The Beijing Guozijian (Imperial College), dating to 1306, and a Temple of Confucius, built in 1302, are located in this street. The Yonghe Temple is located next to its east entrance.

References

Dongcheng District, Beijing
Streets in Beijing